"The Things That Dreams Are Made Of" is a song by the English synthpop group The Human League. It was originally recorded for the band's 1981 album Dare, but was remixed, remastered and released as a dance EP single in 2008. It reached number two in the official UK Dance Chart in February 2008.

Background 
The song is the opening track on the Human League's Dare album, recorded at Genetic Studios in the summer of 1981. It was produced by Martin Rushent. The song is a tribute to the simple pleasures in life which are then juxtaposed against a greater ambition. Philip Oakey namechecks some of his and Philip Adrian Wright's favourite things, an eclectic list from ice cream to Norman Wisdom and the names of the band members of Ramones. Wright called the song a metaphor for the band's ambition in 1981.  Backing vocals are performed by Susan Ann Sulley and Joanne Catherall (then 18-year-old schoolgirls) who today, together with Oakey, are now the only remaining band members from the original Dare line up.

Since the recording of Dare, the Human League have frequently played the song live. It was the opening track of performances on the Dare '07 tour.

The first remix of the song appeared on the band's 1982 remix album Love and Dancing, which contained remixes of various tracks from the band's Dare period. In August 2003, a mash-up of the instrumentation of "The Things That Dreams Are Made Of" and the lyrics to SOS Band's "The Finest" was released as a single under the title "Finest Dreams". Produced by Richard X, the song featured American singer Kelis on vocals. The song reached #8 on UK charts. It appears on Richard X's album Richard X Presents His X-Factor Vol. 1

In 2007, Martin Rushent's newly resurrected Genetic Recordings label released a limited edition EP of the song containing the 'More of Mix' and 'Justus Köncke Vocal Mix Edit'. Concurrently Hooj Choons issued a remix of the song by DJ/producer Tommy Bisdee aka 'Kissy Sell Out'. Realising that the song had commercial selling power, Hooj Choons then released a full commercial version on 21 January 2008.

Separate to the Hooj release, a version of the song remixed by British big beat group Groove Armada, appeared on their compilation album Late Night Tales: Groove Armada, released 12 March 2008 by Azuli Records.

Although an officially released Human League single more than a quarter of a century after its first appearance on Dare, the band themselves did not initiate its release and have had nothing to do with the record's promotion. The track became popular with DJs and in clubs, gaining its own momentum through radio play on UK national BBC Radio One. After release it reached number two on the UK Dance Chart and number 17 on the UK Indie Chart in February 2008.  It was the first return to the charts for the Human League in six years.

Track listing 

 "The Things That Dreams Are Made Of" (original dub), mixed by Martin Rushent A
 "The Things That Dreams Are Made Of" (Justus Kohncke dub), mixed by Justus Köncke A
 "The Things That Dreams Are Made Of" (Richard Stone mix), mixed by Richard Stone B

Use in film and television
In the 1982 BBC2 comedy The Young Ones, the song is featured in the episode "Interesting".
The song is played in an early scene in the 1989 film Longtime Companion, which dealt with the 1980s AIDS epidemic. The scene is set in early July 1981, which presents an anachronism as the song was not released (on the Dare album) until October 1981, and even later than that in the US where the film is set.
In 2010, the song was featured in The Kevin Bishop Show Series 2, Episode 5.
Frequent use during the 1980s in the BBC2 series Ski Sunday as incidental music.

References

External links 
 http://www.the-black-hit-of-space.dk/things_that_dreams_are_made_of.htm
 http://www.hooj.com/

2008 singles
The Human League songs
Songs written by Philip Oakey
1981 songs
Song recordings produced by Martin Rushent
Songs written by Philip Adrian Wright